Halcrow may refer to:

William Halcrow (1883–1958), English civil engineer
Halcrow Group, an engineering consultancy
 Halcrow, Manitoba
 Halcrow railway station, a flag stop in Halcrow, Manitoba, Canada, on Via Rail's Winnipeg–Churchill line
Helen Halcrow, later Helen Morgan, British politician elected 2021